Maglic may refer to:
 Maglič
 Maglić